Niphargus spoeckeri is a species of crustacean in the family Niphargidae. It is endemic to Slovenia.

References

External links
 Niphargus Webpage - University of Ljubljana

Niphargidae
Crustaceans described in 1933
Endemic fauna of Slovenia
Taxonomy articles created by Polbot